Anders Rosenberg Hansen (born 16 September 1970) is a semi-retired Danish professional golfer.

Career
Hansen was born in Sønderborg, Denmark. He turned professional in 1995. It took him a few years to establish himself on the European Tour, with his first top 116 Order of Merit finish (the level a player requires to automatically regain his card) coming in 1999.

His maiden European Tour victory was the 2002 Volvo PGA Championship and he finished in the top 60 on the Order of Merit every year from 2000 to 2012, with a best of seventh in 2011. He has featured in the top 25 of the Official World Golf Ranking and has been the highest ranked Danish golfer.

Hansen represented Denmark in the WGC-World Cup in 1999, 2002, 2003, 2004, 2005 and 2007.

Hansen had six top-10 finishes in 2006 including a third at the Dubai Desert Classic, playing the two final days in the leaderball with Tiger Woods and Retief Goosen, and a second at the Italian Open for the second straight year.

Hansen qualified for the PGA Tour for 2007, capturing the fourth available spot, eight strokes off the winner, George McNeill, but failed to maintain his playing rights at the end of the season.

His second European tour victory came when he won the 2007 BMW PGA Championship, the same tournament where he claimed his first victory five years before. Hansen then won his third event in 2009 at the Joburg Open, in South Africa. He came from behind on the final day with a 66, and eventually won by one stroke over Andrew McLardy. A month later he won for the second time on the Sunshine Tour at the Vodacom Championship and after strong finishes in the two European Tour co-sanctioned events at the end of the season, he headed the Order of Merit for 2009.

Hansen achieved his best finish ever at a World Golf Championship event in March 2011, when he finished tied 3rd at the WGC-Cadillac Championship, three strokes behind winner Nick Watney. He later on achieved his best finish in a major, when he finished 3rd in the 2011 PGA Championship.

He retired after the 2015 European Tour season, but still played in a small number of events in 2016. Hansen regained his European Tour card through Q School in 2017.

Professional wins (4)

European Tour wins (3)

1Co-sanctioned by the Sunshine Tour

European Tour playoff record (1–3)

Sunshine Tour wins (2)

1Co-sanctioned by the European Tour

Sunshine Tour playoff record (0–1)

Results in major championships

CUT = missed the half-way cut
"T" = tied

Summary

Most consecutive cuts made – 4 (2006 PGA – 2007 PGA)
Longest streak of top-10s – 1

Results in World Golf Championships

QF, R16, R32, R64 = Round in which player lost in match play
"T" = Tied
Note that the HSBC Champions did not become a WGC event until 2009.

Team appearances
Amateur
European Amateur Team Championship (representing Denmark): 1991, 1993
Eisenhower Trophy (representing Denmark): 1992

Professional
World Cup (representing Denmark): 1999, 2002, 2003, 2004, 2005, 2007, 2008, 2011
Seve Trophy (representing Continental Europe): 2009, 2011

See also
2006 PGA Tour Qualifying School graduates
2017 European Tour Qualifying School graduates

References

External links
 

Danish male golfers
Houston Cougars men's golfers
European Tour golfers
PGA Tour golfers
Sunshine Tour golfers
People from Sønderborg Municipality
Sportspeople from Zürich
1970 births
Living people